Mehmed-beg Kapetanović Ljubušak (19 December 1839 – 29 July 1902) was a Bosnian writer and public official.

Biography 

The Kapetanović family originates from one of the branches of the Croat noble family of Cvitković-Zdilar from Imotski. His paternal ancestor Jozo Cvitković was involved in some uprising there, and escaped to Ljubuški where he converted to Islam and became Sulejman Bey Kapetanović. He briefly served as the replacement of the vizier of Bosnia after Namik Pasha was expelled and replaced by Ibrahim Pasha in 1831.

Mehmed Kapetanović attended the madrasa in Ljubuški and studied oriental languages. Kapetanović arrived to Sarajevo in 1878 where he became the mayor in 1893, holding the office until declining health forced him to resign in 1899. He died in Sarajevo in 1902.

During the late 19th century Kapetanović was active in collecting Bosniak folk treasures in Bosnia and Herzegovina and neighboring regions.
He published several books, the most famous being Narodno blago (English: "The National Wealth") from 1887. In 1891, Kapetanović founded the influential political journal Bošnjak ("Bosniak") which gathered several Bosniak intellectuals of its time.

Kapetanović became the mayor of Sarajevo in 1893 following the 1892 death of the first mayor Mustafa Fadilpašić. The most significant project during Kapetanović's governance was the delivery of electricity to the city. Specifically on 1 May 1895, Sarajevo had, for the first time, electric lighting. Until then, the street lights were oil lanterns. On that same day, Sarajevo became one of the first European cities to have electric tram trains installed, replacing horse-drawn vehicles.

Kapetanović survived a stroke in July 1898. His health rapidly declined and by April 1899, he stepped down as mayor. He died on 29 July 1902 at the age of 62. His son Riza-beg Kapetanović died 24 December 1931.

Main works
Risale-i ahlak (Treatise on Morals, 1883)
Sto misle muhamedanci u Bosni? (What Do Mohammedans in Bosnia Think?, 1886)
Narodno Blago (The National Wealth, 1887)
Boj pod Banjomlukom 1737 (The Banja Luka Battle, 1737, 1888)   
Budućnost ili napredak muhamedanaca u Bosni i Hercegovini (Future or Progress of the Mohammedans in Bosnia and Herzegovina, 1893)

Notes

References 

 

1839 births
1902 deaths
Bosniaks of Bosnia and Herzegovina
Bosnia and Herzegovina Muslims
Bosniak writers
Bosnia and Herzegovina writers
Mayors of Sarajevo
Bosnia and Herzegovina politicians
Ottoman Bosnian nobility
19th-century Bosnia and Herzegovina writers